Robert Easton may refer to:

Robert Easton (actor) (1930–2011), American actor and dialect coach
Robert Easton (bass) (1898–1987), British bass singer
Robert Easton (athlete) (born 1960/61), Canadian Paralympic athlete

See also
Robert Easton Burns (1805–1863), Canadian lawyer and judge